The sixth season of  Alarm für Cobra 11 – Die Autobahnpolizei aired between November 9, 2000 and May 31, 2001.

Format
The main cast didn't change in this season.

Cast
 Semir Gerkhan - Erdogan Atalay
 Rene Steinke - Tom Kranich

Episodes

2000 German television seasons
2001 German television seasons